An emporium (plural: emporia) was one of the trading settlements that emerged in Northwestern Europe in the 6th to the 7th centuries and persisted into the 9th century. Also known in English as wics, they were characterised by their peripheral locations, usually on the shore at the edge of a kingdom, their lack of infrastructure (containing no churches) and their short-lived nature. By 1000, the emporia had been replaced by the revival of European towns. Examples include Dorestad, Quentovic, Gipeswic, Hamwic, and Lundenwic (for which see Anglo-Saxon London) at the North Sea, as well as Haithabu, Jumne and Truso on the Baltic Sea. Their role in the economic history of Western Europe remains debated. Their most famous exponent has been the British archaeologist Richard Hodges.

See also
-wich town

References
 Anderton (Mike) (ed.). Anglo-Saxon Trading Centres: Beyond the Emporia. Cruithne Press. Glasgow. 1999.
 Crabtree (Pamela J.) (ed.). Medieval Archaeology: An Encyclopedia. Routledge. New York. 2013. 448p.
 Hill (D.), Cowie (R.) (eds.). Wics: The Early Medieval Trading Centres of Northern Europe. Sheffield. 2001
 Hodges (Richard). 'Towns and Trade in the Age of Charlemagne'. 2001.
 Hodges (Richard). Dark Age Economics, Origins of Towns and Trade AD 600–1000. Duckworth. London. 1989. 230p.
 Loveluck (Christopher). Northwest Europe in the Early Middle Ages, c. AD 600–1150: A Comparative Archeology. Cambridge University Press. Cambridge. 2013. 488p.
 Loveluck (Christopher). Rural settlement, lifestyles and social change in the later first millennium AD: Anglo–Saxon in its wider context. Excavations at Flixborough Volume 4. Oxbow Books. Oxford. 2007. 194p.
 Sherman (Heidi Michelle). Barbarians Come to Market: The Emporia of Western Eurasia from 500 BC to AD 1000 (PhD Dissertation). ProQuest. Ann Arbor. 2008. 369p.
 Valante (Mary A.). Vikings in Ireland, Settlement, Trade and Urbanisation. Four Courts Press. Dublin. 2008. 216p.
 Verhulst (Adriaan E.). 'Emporium', in Lexikon des Mittelalters, III, München - Stuttgart, [1977]-1999, klm. 1897–1898. (online bekeken)
 Verhulst (Adriaan E.). The Rise of Cities in North–West Europe. Cambridge University Press. Cambridge. 1999. 174p.

Medieval society
Early Middle Ages